Julio Cesar Martinez Aguilar (born 27 January 1995) is a Mexican professional boxer, who has held the WBC flyweight title since 2019.

As of November 2022, Martinez is ranked as the best active flyweight boxer in the world by ESPN, second by The Ring and TBRB, and tenth by BoxRec.

Professional career

Early career
Martinez made his professional debut against Joaquin Cruz on October 16, 2015. He lost the fight by a split decision. He would go on to amass a 13-1 record over the course of his next 13 fights.

Martinez was scheduled to fight Andrew Selby on March 23, 2019, in a WBC Flyweight title eliminator to determine the next mandatory challenger. Martinez won the fight by a fifth-round knockout, handing Selby the first loss of his professional career. Selby had a great start to the fight, before a clash of heads in the third round cut him along his left eyebrow, for which Martinez was deducted a point. Martinez enjoyed more success from the third round onward, knocking Selby down with a liver shot 57 seconds into the fifth round.

WBC Flyweight champion

Martinez vs. C. Edwards
As Martinez had secured his position as the mandatory WBC flyweight title challenger with the fifth-round knockout of Andrew Selby, WBC ordered the reigning flyweight world champion Charlie Edwards to defend his title against Martinez. They were later given a weeklong extension from the sanctioning body to come to terms as regards the purse and venue. The two parties avoided going to a purse bid, agreeing to fight at The O2 Arena in London, on the Lomachenko vs Campbell undercard, on August 31, 2019.

In the third round of the fight, Martinez landed a combination of punches which staggered the champion, forcing him to take a knee. As he did so, Martinez landed a heavy body shot that completely took Edwards out of the fight. Referee Mark Lyson stopped the bout, while WBC president Mauricio Sulaiman reviewed the fight ending sequence. Sulaiman found the fight ending shot to have landed egregiously late, officially overturning the fight to a no-contest.

During the post-fight interview, Edwards stated: "This is the right decision. I took a knee for a purpose...We get in this ring to abide by the rules". WBC president Mauricio Sulaiman said he had ordered a rematch, to which Edwards acquiesced. Edwards' manager Eddie Hearn was elusive as to the rematch, however, claiming that they planned to move up to super flyweight. Edwards officially vacated his WBC Flyweight title on October 6, 2019.

Martinez vs. Rosales
Following former WBC flyweight champion Charlie Edwards’ decision to vacate the title and move to super flyweight, WBC scheduled the #1 ranked Martinez to fight the #2 ranked Cristofer Rosales for the vacant WBC Flyweight championship. Martinez was scheduled to fight the former WBC flyweight titlist on December 20, 2019, on the undercard of the Super-Middleweight fight between Daniel Jacobs and Julio Cesar Chavez Jr. In November 2019, it was revealed that Martinez had tested positive Clenbuterol, a banned substance. WBC decided not to punish him, as the amount of the muscle-forming drug found in his system wasn't deemed sufficient to register any in-competition benefit. Martinez won the fight with Rosales by a ninth-round technical knockout. Martinez took over the fight in the third round, after two competitive back-and-forth rounds, battering the exhausted former champion until referee Raul Caiz stopped the fight.

Martinez vs. Harris
Martinez was scheduled to make his first title defense against Jay Harris, on February 29, 2020. It was scheduled for the undercard of the Mikey Garcia-Jessie Vargas welterweight fight. Martinez was the favorite heading into the bout, with Harris being a 7/1 underdog. Martinez pressured throughout the first half of the fight, with his pace slowing from the eight round onward. Harris suffered a cut above his left eye in the second round, and was knocked down in the tenth round. Martinez won the fight by unanimous decision, with varied scorecards of 118-109, 116-111, and 115-112.

Martinez vs. Calleros
Martinez was scheduled to make his second title defense against Maximino Flores on October 23, 2020. Four days before the fight, Flores announced his withdrawal from the bout due to a positive COVID-19 test. Accordingly, Martinez was rescheduled to defend his title against Moisés Calleros. Calleros accepted the fight on less than one week’s notice. Due to the short notice, he was unable to cut weight properly, and weighed in at 117.4 pounds, 5.4 pounds over the title limit. Martinez won the fight by a second-round technical knockdown. He staggered Calleros with a left hook-right straight combination, before unloading with numerous power punches, which forced the referee Cesar Castanon to stop the fight at the 2:42 minute mark. During the post fight interview, Martinez stated his desire to fight fellow titleholder Artem Dalakian and Moruti Mthalane in a title unification bouts, before moving up to super flyweight.

Martinez vs. Cordova
Martinez was scheduled to defend his title for the third time against the former unified minimumweight world champion Francisco Rodríguez Jr. on December 19, 2020, on the Canelo Álvarez and Callum Smith undercard. Rodríguez Jr. later withdrew from the bout, due to a non-COVID related illness. Martinez was expected to defend his title against McWilliams Arroyo on February 27, 2021. The fight was scheduled as the co-main event to Canelo Álvarez's super middleweight fight with Avni Yıldırım. Martinez withdrew from the fight the day before, due to a hand injury. He suffered a small fracture in his right hand during a sparring session, which was aggravated during the week preceding the fight, causing his hand to swell. Martinez was scheduled to make his third title defense against Joel Cordova on June 26, 2021. Cordova was ranked #15 by the WBC. He won the fight by a sixth-round technical knockout. Marzinez first knocked Cordova down with a left hook and piled on strikes which forced the referee to stop the fight.

Martinez vs. Arroyo
On October 4, 2021, it was revealed that Martinez would face the WBC interim flyweight titleholder McWilliams Arroyo on November 19, 2021, on the undercard of the Demetrius Andrade and Jason Quigley middleweight title fight. The bout would be streamed by DAZN from the SNHU Arena in Manchester, New Hampshire. The pair was originally scheduled to face each other on February 27, 2021, before Martinez withdrew due to a hand injury. The fight was ruled a no-contest at the end of the second round, due to an accidental clash of heads which caused cut above Arroyo's right. The fight was stopped after Arroyo told the ringside physician that he was unable to see out of the damaged eye.

Martinez vs. Gonzalez
Martinez faced the former four-weight world champion Román González in the main event of a DAZN broadcast card on March 5, 2022 at junior bantamweight. Gonzalez was ranked #1 by the WBA and #2 by the WBC, as well as #2 by The Ring. Martinez stepped in with less than six weeks notice as replacement for Juan Francisco Estrada, who was forced to withdraw from the fight due to a positive COVID-19 test. He was defeated by Gonzalez by unanimous decision, with the judges scoring the fight 118–110, 117–111 and 116–112 all in favor of Gonzalez.

Martinez vs. Carmona
Martinez was expected to face the WBC interim flyweight champion McWilliams Arroyo in a rematch on June 25, 2022, after their first fight ended in a no-contest following an accidental head clash in the third round. On June 22, three days before the bout was supposed to take place, Martinez withdrew with an illness. This marked the third time that he had withdrawn from this specific match up, having withdraw once in each of the two previous calendar years. The pair reached an agreement to pursue separate bouts on July 12, which allowed Martinez to enter into negotiations for a title unification bout with the reigning IBF flyweight titlist Sunny Edwards. As these negotiations fell through, Martinez was once again booked to face the WBC interim champion McWilliams Arroyo. The bout was expected to take place at the Desert Diamond Arena in Glendale, Arizona on December 3, 2022. Arroyo withdrew from the bout on November 8, with a neck injury. Martinez was re-scheduled to face Samuel Carmona at the same date and venue. He won the fight by majority decision, with two judges awarding him a 117–111 and 116–112 scorecard, while the third judge scored the bout as an even 114–114 draw.

Professional boxing record

See also
List of world flyweight boxing champions
List of Mexican boxing world champions

References

External links

Julio Cesar Martinez - Profile, News Archive & Current Rankings at Box.Live

1995 births
Living people
Mexican male boxers
Boxers from Mexico City
Flyweight boxers
Super-flyweight boxers
World flyweight boxing champions
World Boxing Council champions